A kulhar (Hindi: कुल्हड़ and Urdu: کلہڑ) or kulhad, sometimes called a shikora, is a traditional handleless pottery cup from South Asia that is typically undecorated and unglazed, and is meant to be disposable. Kulhars are almost never reused.

Bazaars and food stalls in the Indian subcontinent traditionally served hot beverages, such as tea, in kuhlars, which suffused the beverage with an "earthy aroma" that was often considered appealing. Yoghurt, hot milk with sugar as well as some regional desserts, such as kulfi (traditional ice-cream), are also served in kulhars. Kulhars have gradually been replaced by polystyrene and coated paper cups, because the latter are lighter to carry in bulk and cheaper.⁠⁠

Possible origins

Kulhars may have been in use in the region for the past 5,000 years, since the Indus Valley civilization.

Effects on taste
Since kulhars are unglazed, a hot drink such as tea partially soaks into the interior wall of the kulhar in which it being served. This has an enhancing effect on the beverage's taste and fragrance, which is sometimes described as "earthy" (सौंधी ख़ुशबू, sondhi khushboo). Although kulhars have been losing ground to synthetic cups due to cost and efficiency reasons, higher-end restaurants often serve kulhar-waali chai (tea in kulhars) to their customers.

Revival efforts by Indian Railways and criticism

In 2004, the Indian Railways (then under the leadership of minister Laloo Prasad Yadav) attempted to revive the use of kulhars for tea and other beverages sold at railway stations and aboard trains. It was argued that this was more hygienic than plastic, and also more environmentally friendly because kulhars are made exclusively from clay. It was also believed that, since kulhars are manufactured by small operations, this would assist in boosting rural employment.

Critics countered that the railways would need to dispense about 1.8 billion kulhars a year, which would mean heavy fuel consumption in the kilns with associated pollution. Kulhars were claimed to take up to a decade to degrade, however the discovery of thousands of years old shards from Indus Valley ruins was used as evidence to challenge that assertion and that they are environmentally superior.

Although alternatives to topsoil are available and kulhars can be made at lower temperatures to save fuel and make them more rapidly degradable, by 2008, the effort to revive kulhar use on the railways was being considered a failure with the continuing widespread use of plastic and coated-paper cups. The primary reasons were the weight of kulhars and the higher per-unit cost. One estimate claimed procurement costs to be 140 paisas per kulhar and 7–10 paisas for coated-paper cups. There were also some vendor complaints that, because kulhars absorb liquids to some extent, buyers have to be given more tea per serving in a kulhar than in a disposable plastic cup.

See also
 Matki
 Mashk

References

Food packaging
Indian culture
Pakistani culture
Indo-Caribbean culture
Indian pottery
Containers

External links
Video of handthrowing kulhars
Video of kulhars in use